"There Will Never Be Another Tonight" is a song written by Bryan Adams, Robert Lange, and Jim Vallance for Adams sixth studio album Waking Up the Neighbours (1991). It was the third single released from the album, in November 1991. The song peaked at number two on Canada's RPM Top Singles chart, number six on the US Billboard Album Rock Tracks chart, and number 31 on the Billboard Hot 100. The song has only appeared on one compilation album released by Adams: Anthology (2005). Starting in 2009, the song is used as the opening theme song for the CBC reality competition, Battle of the Blades.

Writing and recording
The song was produced by Mutt Lange and Bryan Adams and was recorded by Nigel Green at Battery Studios, London, and by Ken Lomas at Warehouse Studios, Vancouver. It was mixed by Bob Clearmountain at Mayfair Studios, London.
	
Vallance's involvement was minimal when "There Will Never Be Another Tonight" was written and recorded, although it was actually written in 1988 or '89 by both Adams and Vallance. The demo got the title "Buddy Holly Idea" since it is vaguely reminiscent of the Buddy Holly song "Peggy Sue". Lange and Adams turned the demo into a song.

Chart performance
In the United States, the song reached the top forty on the Billboard Hot 100, and the following week it debuted on the Billboard Album Rock Tracks chart at 6. In Canada, it peaked on the RPM Top singles chart at number two, becoming the first single from the album to not top the listing.

The song was released in Australia, Europe, and New Zealand in 1991. "(Everything I Do) I Do It for You" (Waking Up the Neighbours first single) and "Can't Stop This Thing We Started" reached the UK top five. "There Will Never Be Another Tonight" continued the trend of lower-charting singles when it debuted and peaked at number 31 on the UK Singles Chart. Although "There Will Never Be Another Tonight" reached the top twenty in Ireland, it was a moderate top thirty success in the Netherlands and the top thirty in Australia and Sweden.

Music videos
The video for this song was directed by Steve Barron and shot at Sheffield Arena. Actress Rachel Weisz can be seen in audience.

Track listingCD single'
 "There Will Never Be Another Tonight"
 "One Night Love Affair" (live in Brussels, Belgium) 
 "Into The Fire" (live in Tokyo, Japan)

Personnel
 Bryan Adams – rhythm guitar, vocals and backing vocals
 Keith Scott – lead guitar, backing vocals
 Robbie King – organ
 Phil Nichols – keyboards and programming
 Dave Taylor – bass
 Mickey Curry – drums
 Mutt Lange – backing vocals

Charts

Weekly charts

Year-end charts

References

External links
 JimVallance.com

1991 singles
1991 songs
A&M Records singles
Bryan Adams songs
Music videos directed by Steve Barron
Song recordings produced by Robert John "Mutt" Lange
Songs written by Bryan Adams
Songs written by Jim Vallance
Songs written by Robert John "Mutt" Lange